Ruma railway station is a railway station on Belgrade–Šid, first on Ruma–Zvornik railway and railway junction. Located in Ruma, Serbia. Railroad continued to Voganj in one, in the other direction to Putinci and the third direction towards to Buđanovci. Ruma railway station consists of 15 railway track.

See also 
 Serbian Railways

References 

Ruma
Railway stations in Vojvodina